was a railway station on the Sekihoku Main Line in Engaru, Hokkaido, Japan, operated by Hokkaido Railway Company (JR Hokkaido). Opened in 1929, the station closed in March 2016.

Lines
The station was numbered "A47".

Station layout
The station had two side platforms serving two tracks on the otherwise single-track line. The station was unstaffed, but had a station structure and waiting room.

Adjacent stations

History
The station opened on 12 August 1929. With the privatization of Japanese National Railways (JNR) on 1 April 1987, the station came under the control of JR Hokkaido.

In July 2015, JR Hokkaido announced that it would be closing the station along with three others on the line (Kyū-Shirataki Station, Kami-Shirataki Station, and Kanehana Station) in March 2016, due to low passenger usage.

The station closed following the last day of services on 25 March 2016.

Surrounding area
 National Route 333
 Yūbetsu River

See also
 List of railway stations in Japan

References

External links

 JR Hokkaido Station information 

Railway stations in Hokkaido Prefecture
Stations of Hokkaido Railway Company
Railway stations in Japan opened in 1929
Railway stations closed in 2016
2016 disestablishments in Japan